Zinc finger protein 121 is a protein that in humans is encoded by the ZNF121 gene.

References 

Human proteins